This is a list of fictional couriers in film and television that have been identified by name in notable works. A courier is usually someone who delivers something such as a message, package, or letter from one person to another. Couriers can be employees working exclusively for one person or can be freelance who are hired for one job. Couriers are different than mail service as they are a single person working exclusively for their client at one time.

Movies and Television

References 

Lists of film characters
Lists of television characters
Couriers
Fictional couriers